Dori'o (also known as Kwarekwareo) is an Oceanic language of the Solomon Islands.

References

Southern Malaita languages
Languages of the Solomon Islands